Yeh Duniya Ghazab Ki is a sitcom aired on Doordarshan in early 1990s.

Dialogues of the show were written by acclaimed writer Sharad Joshi, direction was by Raman Kumar and production was by Oberoi Films. Title song of the show was sung by Kumar Sanu and Udit Narayan

Plot 
Yeh Duniya Ghazab Ki is a satirical comedy which exposes the red tape in our government & the delusion of a common man. Nihaal (Rakesh Bedi) a simpleton from a small town comes to city, with an aspiration of reaping a reward from the government for his good work. He is supported by good Samaritans, however, in the crowd of contemporary cosmopolitan culture, he encounters, for the first time in his life, the complexities of the inevitable red tape. He is enmeshed in a dual of egoistic duplicity. Nihaal returns to his rural roots after being used comprehensively by government officials

Cast
 Rakesh Bedi as Nihal
 Rajesh Puri
 Swaroop Sampat
 Neha Sharad
 Tiku Talsania as Maharaja
 Shail Chaturvedi
 Achut Potdar
 Satish Shah

References

Indian comedy television series
DD National original programming
1990s Indian television series